Racket-tail is the common name for a genus of parrots (Prioniturus) from south-east Asia.

Racket-tail or racquet-tail may also refer to:

Birds
 Racket-tailed coquette (Discosura longicaudus), a hummingbird species from South America
 Racket-tailed roller (Coracias spatulatus), a bird species from Africa
 Racket-tailed treepie (Crypsirina temia), a bird species from Asia
 Racquet-tailed kingfisher or common paradise kingfisher (Tanysiptera galatea), a bird species from Asia
 Racket-tailed drongo:
 Greater racket-tailed drongo (Dicrurus paradiseus), a bird species from Asia
 Lesser racket-tailed drongo (Dicrurus remifer), a bird species from Asia

Other
 Dorocordulia libera, the racket-tailed emerald, a dragonfly species from North America

See also
 Booted racket-tail